Rockingham Speedway, formerly North Carolina Motor Speedway and later North Carolina Speedway is a racetrack located near Rockingham, North Carolina.  It is also known as The Rock and previously hosted NASCAR Cup Series, NASCAR Xfinity Series, NASCAR Camping World Truck Series, ARCA Menards Series, CARS Tour, and UARA-Stars races.

The track opened as a flat, one-mile oval on October 31, 1965. In 1969, the track was extensively reconfigured to a high-banked, D-shaped oval just over one mile in length. In 1997, North Carolina Motor Speedway merged with Penske Motorsports, and was renamed "North Carolina Speedway". Shortly thereafter, the infield was reconfigured, and competition on the infield road course, mostly by the SCCA, was discontinued. Until 2013, it was home to the Fast Track High Performance Driving School,  The track was used often for television and movie filming. Currently, The Rock is undergoing renovations and updates by the current ownership in order to house large-scale racing events and festivals.

History

Opening
Rockingham Speedway, known as North Carolina Motor Speedway in 1965, began as a project of Harold Brasington and Bill Land. Brasington had relevant experience from his involvement in building the Darlington Raceway, which was NASCAR's first superspeedway. Bill Land owned the property at the time, and together they set out to find funding. They went to local lawyer Elsie Webb who assembled a group of backers. The duo also sold shares to the locals for $1 per share, and at one time had about 1,000 shareholders.

The speedway was built as a one-mile oval with flat turns. North Carolina Motor Speedway opened on October 31, 1965, holding its first race on the same day. The American 500 was a 500-lap, 500-mile NASCAR Grand National Series race won by Curtis Turner at an average speed of 101.942 miles per hour. Turner dominated the race, which was attended by 35,000 people, leading 239 laps and winning by 11 seconds. The winner's purse was $13,090. The American 500 was the 54th of 55 races in the 1965 season, which included NASCAR legends Cale Yarborough (who finished second), Richard Petty, Ned Jarrett (who would go on to win the championship), Buddy Baker, David Pearson, and Junior Johnson. Only 19 of the 43 cars were running at the end of the race.

The speedway held two Grand National races the next year, the Peach Blossom 500, and the American 500. The Peach Blossom 500 would change names multiple times, usually using the name Carolina 500, before ending as the Subway 400. The American 500 would also change names multiple times as well, ending as the Pop Secret Microwave Popcorn 400. The first race was typically held in early March or late February, and the second race was held in late October.  In 1967 and 1968 the Carolina 500 was run in June.  The speedway held two Grand National Series races every year until 2004.

1999–2007
As part of the acquisition of the Penske Speedways in 1999, the Speedway was sold to International Speedway Corporation (ISC) and in 2004, one of its two Cup races (the crucial fall race, often the penultimate date on the schedule) was transferred to ISC's California Speedway. The change was made after sagging attendance at Rockingham Speedway. It left the track with only one date, in late February, a highly unpopular date for spectators due to the commonly unpredictable weather. That date was moved up from the traditional early spring date in 1992 when Richmond International Raceway wanted a later date than the traditional post-Daytona date because of two postponements in the late 1980s caused by snow.  Rumors persisted that the track's lone remaining date was also in jeopardy, as several new tracks in larger, warm-weather markets coveted the date, which was the first race following the Daytona 500, and in 2002 and 2004, Fox's first race of the season.

Despite wide speculation that the race was in its final year, it failed to sell out, falling nearly 10,000 short of the 60,000 capacity. The track indeed hosted its final race, the Subway 400, on February 22, 2004. In that last race, Matt Kenseth held off rookie Kasey Kahne on the last lap to win by only 0.010 seconds. This finish was one of the closest in NASCAR history, and is viewed by many fans as one of the best finishes that season. It is also known for a wild crash early in the race in which Carl Long flipped wildly down the backstretch.

In the wake of the Ferko lawsuit (in which a shareholder sued NASCAR, alleging a failed promise to schedule a race to a competing track), and the poor attendance, the track's state of affairs was sharply altered. In the settlement, ISC sold Rockingham Speedway to Speedway Motorsports (SMI), and the track's lone remaining race was "transferred" to Texas Motor Speedway. Some NASCAR fans saw things differently, however, because it was Darlington Raceway's prestigious Southern 500 removed from the schedule for the second race in Texas, and the date for The Rock was sent to Phoenix International Raceway.  SMI agreed to host no NASCAR events at the track while it was under their ownership. Upon its exit from the NASCAR circuit, The Rock joined such facilities as Ontario Motor Speedway, Riverside International Raceway, North Wilkesboro Speedway, Texas World Speedway, and Music City Motorplex as tracks removed from the circuit.

The Rockingham track was often praised for good racing, including 37 official lead changes in one race in 1981, and for having great sightlines for spectators.  However, the facility made limited infrastructure reinvestments over the years while being owned by the DeWitt family, and seemed to lag behind other facilities which continually modernized and updated their business plans, especially after it was sold to pay off estate taxes owed by the DeWitt and Wilson families which had owned the track.

2007–2018
Speedway Motorsports put the track up for auction on October 2, 2007, and Andy Hillenburg paid $4.4 million for the track.

In 2008, Rockingham Speedway began the ARCA Re/Max Series (now ARCA Menards Series) race, dubbed the American 200. This has been the premier event at Rockingham since its reopening. In 2009 Rockingham held an additional ARCA race, however that race was not held in 2010. Rockingham also holds the Carolina 200 for the CARS Pro Cup Series.

On September 7, 2011, it was announced that Rockingham would host the NASCAR Camping World Truck Series for the first time, on April 15, 2012, with the race dubbed as the Good Sam Roadside Assistance 200. The announcement was made by track owner Andy Hillenburg and North Carolina governor Bev Perdue, who said that the track would help the local economy by about $7.2–$10.5 million (2011 USD). Wayne Auton, the Truck Series director, announced that NASCAR testing would end on December 31, 2011, on the main track, but would remain on the half-mile facility.

On January 30, 2012, it was announced that the second annual Carolina Rebellion festival would be held at the Rockingham Speedway.

In 2014, the Truck Series did not return to the track due to financial struggles. In September of the same year, it was reported that Farmers & Merchants Bank was requesting a court order to take "immediate and exclusive custody" of the speedway from co-owners Hillenburg and Bill Silas, who were reported to owe $4.5 million to the bank. Vets-Help.org, a non-profit organization, acquired the track and proposed a residential complex for returning and disabled veterans nearby as well as other related support services. However, Vets-Help's lease of the track would be terminated in 2016.

In 2016, Level 1 Motorsports announced the creation of the X-Cup Series, which expressed plans to run a ten-race schedule at the track, two of which would be run on the infield road course. This turned out to be a scam and it ripped off both car owners, drivers, and the veterans group they claimed to support. However, the track was foreclosed on in July 2015 because of outstanding debt that Andy Hillenburg had accumulated after his purchase of the speedway. On May 16, 2016, BK Rock Holdings purchased Rockingham Speedway at a Richmond County Courthouse auction for $3 million.

2018–present
Rockingham Properties LLC is the owner of the track, having purchased it on August 30, 2018. Four days after the purchase, the company announced that racing would be returning to the track in some form in the near future. In his 2019–2021 budget recommendation, North Carolina governor Roy Cooper proposed $8 million of state money to renovate the facility, which would be renamed "The Rock Speedway and Entertainment Complex".

On December 12, 2020, MB Drift (formerly the Myrtle Beach Drift Series) hosted a drift event at Rockingham Speedway, helping to bring new life into the facility. This event attracted the attention of Formula D Pro 1 driver Jonathan Nerren, as well as Pro 2 driver Cory Talaska, and 40+ local grassroots and Pro-Am drifters. MB Drift has 10 events dates set for their 2021 season at Rockingham. Stock car racing was planned to return to Rockingham in 2021, with the CARS Solid Rock Carriers Tour planned to race on November 6. The race, dubbed the LeithCars.com Presents Race the Rock 125, was cancelled due to a tire shortage by Hoosier.

On November 18, 2021, North Carolina Governor Roy Cooper signed the 2021-2022 North Carolina state budget, which allocated $40 million of tax payer money for three race tracks: Charlotte Motor Speedway, North Wilkesboro Speedway, and Rockingham Speedway. The plans of use of the funds according to Rockingham Speedway and Entertainment Complex's vice president of operations Justin Jones, “We intend on repaving the track, putting brand new asphalt down. We intend on lighting up the big track as well as Little Rock... Our intention is to bring back NASCAR as well as ARCA and SRX. Just good old-fashion racing. Good old-fashion tailgate-sitting, lawn chairs, coolers beside the lawn chairs."

Testing
Rockingham became in the mid-to-late 2000s a test track for many NASCAR Cup Series and Xfinity Series teams because of testing restrictions by NASCAR on active tracks.  After the track was stripped of its dates, teams began using the circuit to test cars and engines, especially to simulate abrasive wear at certain tracks (Darlington and Atlanta most notably). The track surface is more abrasive than other tracks, due to the high sand content of paving compounds made from local materials. This abrasiveness contributes to excessive tire wear.  In 2005, Kyle Petty tested his Darlington car at Rockingham days before its race to not waste one of his five assigned tests.

In 2006, new rules banned all testing at active Sprint Cup tracks except at selected NASCAR-approved open tests during the season, thereby making testing at Rockingham crucial. Penske Racing tested at the track in mid-April 2006, and with the abrasiveness of the Atlanta Motor Speedway surface, which has not been repaved since reconstruction in 1997, and Atlanta's participation in the Chase for the Cup, many teams are considering returning to Rockingham in September or October to test their cars to simulate Atlanta's similar surface.

NASCAR's new Car of Tomorrow (or COT) has led to a boom in testing at the track, and many teams used the track for testing the new cars when it was announced the car would be used in 2007.

In the runup to the COT's debut, Michael Waltrip Racing, Gillett Evernham Motorsports, Yates Racing, and Roush Fenway Racing tested their COTs at the track.

Elliott Sadler was asked about testing the Car of Tomorrow at Phoenix International Raceway the day after the 2006 Checker Auto Parts 500.

No, I'm going to Rockingham on Wednesday to test the (Car of Tomorrow). We wanted to go to a very bumpy racetrack. The car slams down on the banking very hard at Rockingham and make sure we've got all the springs and all the bumps very smooth feeling. That'll be my first time in the COT. I'm pretty anxious and looking forward to it. NASCAR fans, and we're all fans in this garage, don't like change. We're just skeptical of it, and we've had some really good racing this year, some of the best racing we've had in a while. We're just starting to learn how to get our cars better with the short spoilers. Nobody really wants to change, but how can you complain or argue with NASCAR? They've done such a good job the past 10 years of growing our sport and making it more fan friendly and appealing to TV and things like that. If they think this is going to help our sport grow, we've got to get in there whether we think it's right or wrong and do it with them.

Greg Biffle said during the 2007 NASCAR Jackson Hewitt Preseason Thunder press conference, "Pat (Tryson, crew chief, who was subsequently released and joined Penske Racing) and I are going to Rockingham (January 18) with a COT to try to learn some things about them, bump stops and all of the things that are new on them, you know, because we are going to race them at Darlington. But those are going to be keys to making the Chase is running well with that COT car and getting our downforce cars to handle good."

Testing at Rockingham has become a premium because of NASCAR's rules limiting testing imposed since 2006 to the NASCAR-sanctioned open tests.  NASCAR rules prior to 2015 stated testing at tracks not on the series in question is not controlled by the sanctioning body, and many teams evade the testing ban at such tests, which also include the Greenville-Pickens Speedway and Concord Motorsports Park (short tracks), and the Kentucky Speedway (NASCAR Cup Series tests only until 2011). Testing at Rockingham is restricted to series that do not run at the circuit (NASCAR mostly), while restrictions to ARCA and CARS-sanctioned open testing apply in those two series because Rockingham is on both series' schedules in 2008. For NASCAR teams, the track has become one of the most popular tracks to test shorter to intermediate tracks on the circuit.

For the 2009 season, NASCAR imposed a blanket ban on testing at any track used by any of NASCAR's three national series or its West/East (currently run under the ARCA Menards Series banner) touring events.  Rockingham, unlike many tracks used in testing historically, is not on any of the series in question, and teams continued to use both tracks to run around NASCAR's testing ban (except in 2012 and 2013, when it was part of the Trucks calendar) until NASCAR completely banned all private testing in 2015.

Little Rock
A new  track, named the Little Rock, was built behind the backstretch for other classes of short-track cars and for the Fast Track driving school Hillenburg owns, and opened on October 13, 2008.  NASCAR Sprint Cup teams immediately christened the track for testing in preparation for the TUMS QuikPak 500 at Martinsville Speedway that ensuing weekend, as "Little Rock" is designed similar to Martinsville, yet the lap length is the same, with 800' straights, 588' turns, and the inside lanes of the turns are concrete. Unlike the  oval, which was restricted from NASCAR testing use in 2012 and 2013, NASCAR testing remain unrestricted on the Little Rock during the aforementioned years.

The half-mile oval is unique in that instead of a traditional guardrail around the outside of the track, it uses gravel traps similar to road courses.  Hillenburg said this is for economical reasons, as a car sliding into a sand trap will not damage a car as much as hitting a wall.

Hillenburg noted, "We've designed a track that can measure one's skill level and they can slide off into a sand trap and not a wall. I can now give parents a straight-up answer as to where their kids stack up." Jimmie Johnson was part of the opening group of drivers to test at "Little Rock," and blew a tire.  He jokingly said he nearly ran into his own transporter because of the track's design that lacked the concrete wall for safety.

The track also has an integrated quarter-mile oval for the Bandoleros and Legends cars.

Track Records
NASCAR Cup Qualifying: 23.167 seconds, Rusty Wallace, February 25, 2000
NASCAR Cup Race: ~ 27.927 seconds, Jeff Burton, October 24, 1999
NASCAR Xfinity Qualifying: 23.416 seconds, Greg Biffle, February 24, 2001
NASCAR Xfinity Race: ~ 29.432 seconds (Mark Martin, October 19, 1996
NASCAR Truck Qualifying: 24.922 seconds, Jeb Burton, April 14, 2013
NASCAR Truck Race: ~ 34.141 seconds, Kasey Kahne, April 15, 2012

Film and commercial usage
The speedway has become a venue for active filming for movies, television programs, and television commercials, often with its venues being used for various facilities.  Notable films include:

 3: The Dale Earnhardt Story
 Talladega Nights: The Ballad of Ricky Bobby
 Ta Ra Rum Pum (a Bollywood film)
 SPEED Road Tour Challenge (final task)
 2007 UPS commercials featuring Dale Jarrett, the UPS truck, and team.

When it was part of the NASCAR Winston Cup circuit, it also was a filming location for:

 Days of Thunder

It was also used as venue for the truck pull event during World's Strongest Man 2011.

References

External links

 Official web site
 
 2008 Rockingham Speedway Schedule
 Track statistics and winner list at racing-reference.info
 Track page at NASCAR.com
 Tom Roberts Public Relations news release on Kurt Busch and Penske Racing testing at Rockingham.
 2003 Sports Illustrated article on NASCAR considering removing the raceway from the schedule
 AP article on NASCAR being gone from Rockingham
 An article on the pending auction of the track
 Andy Hillenburg's Fast Track High Performance Driving School

NASCAR tracks
ARCA Menards Series tracks
Motorsport venues in North Carolina
NASCAR races at Rockingham Speedway
Buildings and structures in Richmond County, North Carolina
Tourist attractions in Richmond County, North Carolina